Government Higher Secondary School Meenangadi, Kerala, India, was started in 1958. The school is situated about 600 meters from Meenangadi town. In the higher secondary there are science, commerce and humanities batches. The school is popular for the various achievements in art, sports and club activities and social services.

References

High schools and secondary schools in Kerala
Schools in Wayanad district
Educational institutions established in 1958
1958 establishments in Kerala